Liao-Fan's Four Lessons is a book written by Yuan Liaofan (1533–1606), was a Chinese official during the Ming Dynasty, born in present-day Wujiang County, Jiangsu Province. Yuan wrote the book to teach his son, Yuan Tian-Chi. The principal idea behind these lessons is that destiny can be changed through proper cultivation of kindness and humility. Thus, one should not be bound by fate, but by one's own actions.

Yuan Liaofan was told by a Taoist monk surnamed Kong that he would only live to the age of 53 and have no son. At first, he disregarded this monk's words as farcical nonsense, but as Kong's other predictions began to occur with great accuracy, he then proactively made an effort to rewrite his fate. In relating his own life experience in changing destiny, Yuan, at the age of 69, wrote and taught these four lessons to his son.

The first lesson shows how to create destiny. The second lesson explains the ways to reform. The third reveals the ways to cultivate kindness and the fourth discloses the benefits of the virtue of humility.

The book, still in circulation after more than 400 years, is said to be a useful foundation in learning both Confucianism and Buddhism.

Excerpts

3 conditions for reform:
 One must have a sense of shame - conscience.
 One must be cautious and conscientious of one's own intention and conduct at all time, as well as having a solemn respect of the Divine and the Universal rules/Golden rules.
 One must have determination and courage to rectify one's mistakes.

3 methods to reform:
 Changing through action
 Changing through reasoning
 Changing from the heart

10 ways to cultivate kindness:
 Supporting the practice of kindness
 Harboring love and respect
 Helping others succeed
 Persuading others to practice kindness
 Helping those in desperate need
 Developing public projects for the greater benefit of the people
 Giving through donation
 Protecting the proper teaching
 Respecting our elders
 Loving and cherishing all living beings

External links
Liao-Fan's Four Lessons (audio)
Liaofan Society in Changhua (in Chinese)
Liao-Fan's Four Lessons (in Chinese)

Chinese classic texts
Ming dynasty literature
1550 books